Nullification may refer to:

 Nullification (U.S. Constitution), a legal theory that a state has the right to nullify any federal law deemed unconstitutional with respect to the United States Constitution
 Nullification Crisis, the 1832 confrontation between the U.S. government and South Carolina over the latter's attempt to nullify a federal law
 Ordinance of Nullification, declared the Tariffs of 1828 and 1832 null and void within the state borders of South Carolina
 Jury nullification, a legal term for a jury's ability to deliver a verdict knowingly in contradiction to written law
 Nullo (body modification), short for "genital nullification", a member of an extreme body modification subculture

See also
 Annihilation (disambiguation)
 Cancel (disambiguation)